The Eastern Echo is the independent student newspaper of Eastern Michigan University in Ypsilanti, Michigan.  The paper is funded through advertising revenue.  The paper is published on Mondays during the fall and winter semesters. Although EMU funds a Student Media Director, that official has no editorial influence over the content of the Eastern Echo.

History
The Eastern Echo celebrated its 125th anniversary in fall 2005.  The newspaper started as the Normal News in 1881 when the school was known as Normal College.   It later became the Normal College News and, then, the Eastern Echo in 1956, when the university was renamed to Eastern Michigan College.  The newspaper is currently operating out of the second floor of King Hall, a former dormitory which has been converted into office space for a number of campus organizations and services.

Journalistic success
Many former Eastern Echo staffers have established themselves in the professional media business. Their work extends to major metropolitan newspapers, world-class trade publications and the top Internet sites in the U.S. The student paper has been nationally recognized for decades.

Since the 1970s, the newspaper has won 13 Pacemaker awards from the Associated Collegiate Press (most recently back-to-back in 2002 and 2003) and more than 40 awards from the Michigan Collegiate Press Association in the last four years.  In 1980, under the leadership of Editor in Chief Stephen F. Cvengros, it received the Michigan Associated Press Sweepstakes Award, the highest annual citation from that organization, besting professional papers in the state for its breaking news coverage.

In the 2005 Division 1 MCPA contest, the Eastern Echo won eight awards.  The newspaper took second place in general excellence, finishing behind Central Michigan University's CM Life and edging out the University of Michigan's Michigan Daily and Michigan State University's State News.

Publishing and distribution
The Eastern Echo is available for free at virtually any campus building at Eastern Michigan University and at more than 40 off-campus locations.  Its circulation varies from 7,000 to 12,000 throughout the year.  The paper also publishes its content, and archives dating to September 2003, on its website.

External links
 Official Site

Notes

Eastern Michigan University
Student newspapers published in Michigan
1881 establishments in Michigan